Todd Starkey (born June 5, 1971) is an American basketball coach who is currently the head women's basketball coach at Kent State University.

Career
He was previously an assistant coach at Indiana University Bloomington and was also the head women's basketball coach at Lenoir–Rhyne University from 2005 to 2014, where he won a national coach of the year award in 2009.

Head coaching record

Notes

References

External links 
 
 Kent State Golden Flashes profile

1971 births
Living people
People from Canfield, Ohio
Basketball players from Ohio
Basketball coaches from Ohio
Mars Hill Lions men's basketball players
Montreat Cavaliers men's basketball players
Montreat Cavaliers men's basketball coaches
Lenoir–Rhyne Bears men's basketball coaches
Lenoir–Rhyne Bears women's basketball coaches
Indiana Hoosiers women's basketball coaches
Kent State Golden Flashes women's basketball coaches